Neosecotium is a genus of fungi in the family Agaricaceae. The genus was circumscribed in 1960 by American mycologists Rolf Singer and Alexander H. Smith. The type species, N. macrosporum, previously only known from the US, was recorded in Mexico in 2012.

See also
List of Agaricaceae genera
List of Agaricales genera

References

Agaricaceae
Agaricales genera
Taxa named by Alexander H. Smith
Taxa named by Rolf Singer